Watercress soup is a soup prepared using the leaf vegetable watercress as a primary ingredient. It may be prepared as a cream soup or as a broth/stock-based soup using vegetable or chicken stock. Additional ingredients used can include vegetables such as potato, leeks, spinach, celery and turnips, cheese, butter, lemon juice, salt and pepper. Watercress soup can be prepared as a puréed soup by mixing the ingredients in a food processor. It can be served hot or cold, and may be garnished with crème fraîche, shaved Parmesan cheese, drizzled olive oil and watercress leaves.

Gallery

See also

 Cabbage soup
 List of soups
 Spinach soup
 Vegetable soup
 List of vegetable soups

References

External links

 Watercress Soup. Bon Appétit.

Vegetable soups